Aleksandr I. Kolpakidi (born 1962, in Tuapse) is a Russian writer and historian.
He is a bestselling author.

He graduated from the Saint Petersburg State University in 1983.

He taught at the Peter the Great St. Petersburg Polytechnic University and Saint Petersburg Electrotechnical University.

From 2003, he was the editor in chief of the publishing house at “Eksmo”.

He has published a number of books.

Aleksandr Kolpakidi lives and works in Moscow.

References

Living people
1962 births
Russian writers
Russian people of Greek descent